Neilston Low railway station was a railway station serving the town of Neilston, East Renfrewshire, Scotland. The station was originally part of the Glasgow, Barrhead and Neilston Direct Railway (GB&N).

History
The station opened by the Glasgow, Barrhead and Neilston Direct Railway, on 5 October 1855, as Crofthead. It was renamed Neilston on 1 June 1868; however it closed shortly after, on 1 May 1870.

The station reopened on 27 March 1871 and became part of the Glasgow, Barrhead and Kilmarnock Joint Railway (GB&K). It was renamed Neilston Low on 24 January 1953 and closed permanently on 7 November 1966.

Today the line is still open as part of the Glasgow South Western Line, although the station is long gone.

See also
 Neilston railway station, on the former Lanarkshire and Ayrshire Railway

References

External links
Video footage of Neilston Low railway station

Disused railway stations in East Renfrewshire
Railway stations in Great Britain opened in 1855
Railway stations in Great Britain closed in 1966
Beeching closures in Scotland
Former Glasgow, Barrhead and Kilmarnock Joint Railway stations